Lothey is a commune in the Finistère department of Brittany in north-western France.

Population
Inhabitants of Lothey are called in French
Lotheyens.

See also
Communes of the Finistère department

References

External links
Mayors of Finistère Association 

Communes of Finistère